Bullnettle (also written "bull nettle", "Bull Nettle" or "bull-nettle") is a common name for several plants and may refer to:

 Cnidoscolus stimulosus (Spurge nettle), a plant of the spurge family (Euphorbiaceae)
 Cnidoscolus texanus (Texas bullnettle), another Euphorbiaceae
 Solanum carolinense (Carolina horsenettle), a plant of the nightshade family (Solanaceae)
 Solanum elaeagnifolium (Silver-leaved nightshade), another Solanaceae